Narasimharaopalem is one of the smallest villages in Chatrai mandal of Krishna district in the Indian state of Andhra Pradesh.

References

Villages in Krishna district